John Rollin Tilton (New London, New Hampshire, USA, 8 June 1828 - 28 March 1888) was an Italian-American painter, mainly of vedute of picturesque urban scenes.

Biography
[[File:American art and American art collections; essays on artistic subjects (1889) (14783033455).jpg|thumb|left|The Grand Canal, Venice, illustration in the book, American Art and American Art Collections: Essays on Artistic Subjects, 1889]]

He was initially self-taught, but then trained in Florence, and later in Rome, where he lived for many years initially making a living painting vedute and reproductions of masters. He painted a Rome from the Aventine, the Lagoon of Venice, The Egitto, and the Lago di Averno. The American statesman Hamilton Fish bought his Vallata Chamounix, and the American businessman W. B. Astor, his Lago di Thun; Louise, lady Ashburton, Dendur in Egypt and Paestum; the Boston mayor Martin Brimmer, his Lago di Como and Venice, and  Count Palfy, his Vedute of Orvieto''. De Gubernatis noted that "those who found Neapolitan vedute painters, warm and scintillating, would find Tilton cold and calm." He painted many watercolors.

Rollin Tilton and his wife, the writer and translator Caroline Town Stebbins, gathered a following among émigrés and visitors from the English speaking world. Among them were John Ruskin and Henry James.

References

1828 births
1888 deaths
19th-century Italian painters
19th-century American painters
19th-century American male artists
American male painters
Italian male painters
Italian vedutisti
Orientalist painters
People from New London, New Hampshire
19th-century Italian male artists